Piano Concerto No. 6 refers to the sixth piano concerto written by one of a number of composers:

Piano Concerto No. 6 (Beethoven) in D major, an arrangement of the Violin Concerto, Op. 61, for solo piano and orchestra (Op. 61a)
Piano Concerto No. 6 (Beethoven) in D major, Hess 15 (incomplete)
Piano Concerto No. 6 (Field) in C major
Piano Concerto No. 6 (Mozart) in B-flat major
Piano Concerto No. 6 (Prokofiev) (unfinished)
Piano Concerto No. 6 (Ries) in C major

See also
 List of compositions for piano and orchestra